The Beach Volleyball Database, also known as BVB Info, is an online website that tracks international beach volleyball players, tournaments and history, including results of continental and international tournaments. It is the only website of its kind in the sport of beach volleyball.

Volleyball Magazine calls the website "a reliable source for entries and results." The site also collaborates with the Fédération Internationale de Volleyball (FIVB) to provide tournament notes to the FIVB website.

History
The Beach Volleyball Database was launched online by Dennis Wagner on June 2, 1999. Wagner (nicknamed "Dr. Ono") operates the website on his own, for free.

References

External links

Beach Volleyball Database

American sport websites
Beach volleyball
Volleyball websites
Internet properties established in 1999
Online databases
Sports databases
1999 establishments in the United States